The  is an award given at the Mainichi Film Awards.

Winners

References

Awards established in 1976
1976 establishments in Japan
Excellence Film
Lists of films by award